Belle Grove is a historic plantation located on U.S. Route 301 in Port Conway, Virginia. The present plantation house was built in 1790.

James Madison, a Founding Father and the  fourth President of the United States, was born on March 16, 1751, at Belle Grove plantation in an earlier house which no longer stands. Belle Grove plantation was also the childhood home of his mother, Eleanor Rose "Nellie" Conway.  Her father Francis Conway was the namesake for Port Conway.

On April 11, 1973, Belle Grove was added to the National Register of Historic Places.

References

External links
Official website
Belle Grove, Rappahannock River, King George County, VA: 3 photos and 2 data pages at Historic American Buildings Survey

Historic American Buildings Survey in Virginia
Houses in King George County, Virginia
Madison family
Plantation houses in Virginia
Georgian architecture in Virginia
Houses on the National Register of Historic Places in Virginia
Houses completed in 1790
James Madison
National Register of Historic Places in King George County, Virginia